Malcolm Alan Bennett (21 September 1958 – 1 March 2015) was a British poet and author. He was the co-creator of the noir-inspired pulp magazine BRUTE! with Aidan Hughes.

References

1958 births
2015 deaths
British writers